is a Japanese guitarist. Other guitarists such as Luke Takamura and Sugizo have cited him as an influence.

Career
Watanabe learned guitar at the age of 12 from Sadanori Nakamure at the Yamaha Music School in Tokyo. He released his first album in 1971. In 1979, he formed a  jazz rock band with some of Japan's leading studio musicians, and recorded the album Kylyn. During that year, he toured with the pop band Yellow Magic Orchestra.

In the 1980s, he toured as guest soloist with Steps, the Brecker Brothers, and Word of Mouth, led by Jaco Pastorius. Watanabe created the jazz-rock/jazz-fusion band Mobo in 1983 with Mitsuru Sawamura (saxophone), Ichiko Hashimoto (piano), Gregg Lee (bass), Shuichi Murakami (drums), and Kiyohiko Senba.

During the eighties Watanabe released the jazz-rock albums To Chi Ka (1980), Mobo Club (1983), Mobo Splash (1985), and Spice of Life (1987). A DVD was issued from the tour which featured drummer Bill Bruford and bassist Jeff Berlin, who also played on the record.

In the 1990s Kazumi assembled an all-Japanese line-up called Resonance Vox (Vagabonde Suzuki on bass, Rikiya Higashihara on drums, Yahiro Tomohiro on percussion). This band has released several adventurous fusion albums.

Discography

As leader

 Infinite (Express, 1971)
 Endless Way (Columbia, 1975)
 Monday Blues (RCA, 1976)
 Milky Shade (Union, 1976)
 Olive's Step (Better Days, 1977)
 Guitar Work Shop (Flying Dog, 1977)
 Lonesome Cat (Denon, 1978)
 Kaleidoscope (Denon, 1978)
 Mermaid Boulevard (Alfa, 1978)
 Tokyo Joe (Denon, 1978)
 Village in Bubbles (Better Days, 1978)
 Kylyn (Better Days, 1979)
 Kylyn Live (Better Days, 1979)
 To Chi Ka (Better Days, 1980)
 Dogatana (Denon, 1981)
 Mobo (Domo, 1984)
 Mobo I (Gramavision, 1984)
 Mobo II (Gramavision, 1984)
 Mobo Live (Domo, 1985)
 Mobo Splash (Domo, 1985)
 The Spice of Life (Domo, 1987)
 The Spice of Life Too (Gramavision, 1988)
 Kilowatt (Gramavision, 1989)
 Romanesque (Domo, 1990)
 Pandora (Polydor, 1991)
 Esprit (Domo, 1996)
 Dandyism (Domo, 1998)
 One for All (EmArcy, 1999)
 Beyond the Infinite (Dozo, 2001)
 Guitar Renaissance (EWE, 2003)
 Mo' Bop II (East Works, 2004)
 Guitar Renaissance II (EWE, 2005)
 Guitar Renaissance III (EWE, 2006)
 Kaihogen (Cube, 2006)
 Guitar Renaissance IV (EWE, 2007)
 Acoustic Flakes (EWE, 2009)
 Jazz Impression (EWE, 2009)
 Tricoroll (EWE, 2011)
 Mo' Bop III (EWE, 2011)
 Guitar Renaissance V (EWE, 2012)
 Live at Iridium (EWE, 2012)
 Spinning Globe (Warner, 2013)
 En Vivo! (Victor, 2015)
 Gracim (Warner, 2016)
 Lotus Night (Warner, 2016)

As sideman

 Jimmy Hopps, Mudari: Spirit of Song (Denon, 1977)
 Hideki Matsutake, Live Space Fantasy (For Life, 1978)
 Jaco Pastorius, Word of Mouth Band 1983 Japan Tour (Rhino, 2012)

References

External links
Kazumi Watanabe Official Site
Kazumi Watanabe 2016 English Interview on Innerviews

1953 births
Living people
Musicians from Tokyo
Jazz fusion guitarists
Japanese jazz guitarists
Japanese session musicians
Gramavision Records artists
Columbia Records artists
PolyGram artists